The  Youngstown State Penguins football team represents Youngstown State University in college football. Youngstown State currently plays as a member of the NCAA at the NCAA Division I Football Championship Subdivision (formerly known as Division I-AA) and are a member of the Missouri Valley Football Conference (MVFC). The Penguins have played their home games in Stambaugh Stadium, more commonly called "The Ice Castle," since 1982.

YSU football has been one of the leading programs in NCAA Division I Football Championship Subdivision, winning four national championships under former head coach Jim Tressel, which is third behind North Dakota State's eight titles and Georgia Southern's six. Overall, YSU has made 11 playoff appearances since Division I FCS (then Division I-AA) was formed in 1978.

History

Conference affiliations 
1938–72: Independent
1973–77: NCAA Division II Independent
1978–80: Mid-Continent Conference
1981–87: Ohio Valley Conference
1988–96  NCAA Division I-AA Independent
1997–present: Missouri Valley Football Conference (known as the Gateway Football Conference until June 2008)

Early history 
The YSU football program began in 1938 as an Independent NCAA team under head coach Dwight "Dike" Beede. The Penguins played their first game on September 15, 1938 in a 12–6 loss to Geneva College. About a month later, on October 22, 1938, Youngstown State won its first game with a 20–0 shutout at Westminster College (PA). The Penguins won their first home game on November 3, 1938 with a 20–14 win against Davis & Elkins College.

Longtime head coach, Dwight "Dike" Beede, made a historical impact on the game of American football after noticing on-field confusion due to officials using whistles to signal a penalty. Beede invented the penalty flag and it was used for the first time during a game on October 17, 1941 against Oklahoma City University at the Youngstown's Rayen Stadium. The flag is now standard at all football games.

Dwight Beede retired from the program after the 1972 season and was replaced by Rey Dempsey starting in the 1973 season. After 35 years as an independent program the football team joined NCAA Division II in 1973. In the 1974 season, the penguins qualified for the Division II playoffs after going 8–1 in the regular season. YSU fell 14–35 against Delaware in the program's first playoff game. Following the 1974 season, Dempsey he left Youngstown State to become a special-teams coach for the Detroit Lions 1975, he was In the three seasons at YSU he compiled a 12–8 record.

Bill Narduzzi became the third coach in program history in 1975. The team joined the Mid-Continent Conference in 1978 and recorded a 9 win regular season under Narduzzi and claimed the Mid-Continent Conference Championship. Narduzzi led Youngstown State to its first playoff win on November 25, 1978 against Nebraska-Omaha. The 21–14 win advanced the team into the Division II Semifinal Playoff Game where the Penguins lost to Eastern Illinois 22–26. The team finished the season with a record of 10–2, the first 10-win season for the program. The 1979 season saw Youngstown State claim their second Mid-Continent Conference Champions going undefeated in conference games and losing only a single game to Delaware. The Penguins defeated South Dakota State 50–7 in the Division II Quarterfinal Playoff Game and shutout Alabama A&M 52–0 in the Division II Semifinal Playoff Game. The win in the semifinal round gave Youngstown state its first appearance in an NCAA Football Championship. The Penguins faced the Delaware Fightin' Blue Hens in the Zia Bowl in Albuquerque, New Mexico for the NCAA Division II Championship. In the championship YSU was defeated by Delaware 21–38 and finished the season with a record of 11–2. In 1981, Youngstown State joined the Ohio Valley Conference (OVC). After going 2–8–1 in the 1980 season, playing a majority of Division I opponents, the Penguins finished their first season in Division I and the OVC with a record of 7–4, including an upset of Cincinnati who was playing as a Division I FBS Independent.

Recent history 
The program's most successful period came from 1986 to 2000 under Jim Tressel. Tressel led the Penguins to four NCAA Division I-AA National Championships. In 1991, YSU won its first national championship, defeating Marshall, and won two more national championships in the following three seasons: against Marshall in 1993 and Boise State in 1994. The Penguins won a fourth title in 1997 with a 10–9 victory against McNeese State. The Tressel era of YSU football also included two stints as national runner-up in 1992 and 1999. YSU's four national championships are third in DI FCS only to North Dakota State's eight titles and Georgia Southern's six. Tressel was also named Division I-AA Coach of the Year in ’91, ’93, ’94 and ’97.

Tressel left Youngstown State following the 2000 season to coach Ohio State, where he coached from 2001 to 2010. Tressel resigned from Ohio State in 2011 after an NCAA investigation of rules violations during the 2010 season and Ohio State self-vacating their wins for 2010 season. Tressel's first incident with the NCAA came during his tenure as YSU head coach when it emerged in 1994 that Ray Issac, the quarterback on the Penguins' 1991 national championship team, had received benefits from Mickey Monus, who was a major benefactor to Youngstown State University. Over Issac's college career, Monus gifted $10,000 in cash and the use of several cars. The NCAA made an inquiry after being tipped off to Monus' actions, but dropped it after a cursory internal investigation by Youngstown State. The true scope of the violations was only revealed in 1998, when Isaac admitted tampering with a juror in Monus' fraud trial. Youngstown State admitted to a lack of institutional control and docked itself some scholarships, but was allowed to keep its 1991 title since the statute of limitations had run out.

His successor, Jon Heacock, did not win a national championship, but still delivered consistent seasons and took them to a national semifinal appearance in 2006 (losing to eventual national champion Appalachian State) prior to resigning following the 2009 season. Eric Wolford, a Youngstown native who has been labeled a top recruiter at the NCAA Division I Football Bowl Subdivision level, was named the sixth head coach in school history on December 15, 2009. Wolford recorded a 3–8 record in his first season in 2010. Despite the record, Youngstown State led at some point in all but one game they played. The streak was ended in the first game of the 2011 season when YSU lost to Michigan State 6–28 and never held a lead in the game. The 2011 season featured improvement to a 6–5 record, highlighted by a victory over eventual FCS National Champion North Dakota State.

The Penguins beat the University of Pittsburgh, 31–17, on September 1, 2012, at Heinz Field in Pittsburgh.  This marked the first time the Penguins had ever beaten a Bowl Championship Series team, though they have several wins over Football Bowl Subdivision teams from non-automatic qualifier conferences, such as the MAC.

The 2016 Penguins went on to the NCAA FCS Championship, in which they lost to James Madison, 28–14. YSU would have not made it to the FCS National Championship game if it were not for one of the best catches in College Football History. In the FCS Semifinals, the Penguins visited Eastern Washington. The Penguins won by a score of 40 to 38. The Penguins prevailed thanks to a touchdown catch by Kevin Rader with one second on the clock. Rader caught the pass pinned to the defender's back from Quarterback Hunter Wells.

National championships
Youngstown State has won four national championships.

Conference championships
Youngstown State has won five conference championships, three outright and two shared. Note that the team was not a member of any conference before 1978 and from 1988 to 1996.

† denotes co-champion

Postseason history

NCAA Division II

NCAA Division I-AA/FCS

Home venue
YSU plays its home games at Stambaugh Stadium, nicknamed "The Ice Castle", which has an official capacity of 20,630.

Rivalries
The Penguins had an annual rivalry with the Akron Zips for possession of the Steel Tire, a trophy based on the prominent industries of each respective city: tires for Akron and steel for Youngstown. The rivalry began in 1940 and was played again in 1941, then was contested annually from 1959–1963 and 1967–1995. Akron moved to Division I-A (FBS) in 1987 and joined the Mid-American Conference in 1992. Since 1995, the series has been dormant. Youngstown State leads the overall series 19–14–2.

Notable players 

The Penguins have sent 21 players to the NFL, including safety Brandian Ross and guard Lamar Mady. Some of their most well-known football alumni include current ESPN Analyst Ron Jaworski, Jeff Wilkins, Paul McFadden, Donald Jones, and Cliff Stoudt. Former former Kansas head coach Mark Mangino played at and began his coaching career at Youngstown State. Former Notre Dame head coach Bob Davie played for the Penguins. Quarterback Ray Isaac played in the Arena Football League. Rudy Florio played in the Canadian Football League. Actor Ed O'Neill, known for his roles in Married... with Children and Modern Family, played defensive lineman at Youngstown State.

Future non-conference opponents 
Future non-conference opponents announced as of January 19, 2023.

See also 
 Youngstown State Penguins

References

External links 
 

 
American football teams established in 1938
1938 establishments in Ohio